Sizang (Sizang, Shiyang), or Siyin (Siyin Chin), is a Kuki-Chin language spoken by the Sizang people in southern Tedim Township, Chin State, Burma.

References

Davis, Tyler. 2018. Verb Stem Alternation in Sizang Chin Narrative Discourse. Master’s thesis. Chiang Mai: Payap University.

Kuki-Chin languages